Agyneta palustris is a species of sheet weaver found in China. It was described by Shu-Qiang Li and Chuan-Dian Zhu in 1995.

References

palustris
Spiders described in 1995
Spiders of China